Tahlequah (Cherokee: ᏓᎵᏆ, daligwa ) is a city in Cherokee County, Oklahoma located at the foothills of the Ozark Mountains. It is part of the Green Country region of Oklahoma and was established as a capital of the 19th-century Cherokee Nation in 1839, as part of the new settlement in Indian Territory after the Cherokee Native Americans were forced west from the American Southeast on the Trail of Tears.

The city's population was 15,753 at the 2010 census, an increase of 8.96 percent over the figure of 14,458 reported in 2000. The 2019 estimated population is 16,819.

Tahlequah is the capital of the two federally recognized Cherokee tribes based in Oklahoma, the modern Cherokee Nation and the United Keetoowah Band of Cherokee Indians. Tahlequah is also the county seat of Cherokee County. The main campus of Northeastern State University is located in the city.

History

Background 
Tahlonteeskee was the first established governmental capital of any kind in what was to become Oklahoma.  It was established in 1828—in land that was part of 1816's Lovely Donations, becoming the first Cherokee Nation–West capital city.  It continued as the capital until 1839 when new arrivals from the Trail of Tears flooded the area.  At that time, Takatoka briefly became the Nation's capital during the construction of the capitol building at Tahlequah.  By mid-1840, the seat of government had been officially moved to Tahlequah.

By 1842, Tahlequah was a growing community and had four stores. In 1844 the National Hotel was built, and the newspaper Cherokee Advocate issued its first edition using a printing press installed in the brand-new Supreme Court building. The first school opened in 1845, and the Tahlequah post office opened in 1847. The Cherokee Male Seminary opened in 1851, offering higher education to Cherokee boys who had already received their primary education.

Etymology

Many linguists believe the word 'Tahlequah' (Tah-le-quah) and the word 'Teh-li-co' are the same as 'di li gwa', the Cherokee word for grain or rice. (See Cherokee Nation Lexicon (dikaneisdi) at cherokee.org under culture/language). Scholars report the Cherokee word 'di li gwa' describes a type of native grain with a red hue that grew in the flat open areas of east Tennessee. One area, Great Tellico (Tellico Plains, Tennessee), was named for the grass with the red seed tops. Others interpret a word 'tel-i-quah' as 'plains'; however, there is no word for 'plains' in the Cherokee lexicon, and the word 'tel-i-quah' is not found in the lexicon. The idea that 'tahlequah' means 'plains' lends weight to the belief that the name refers to the wide open grassy areas of Great Tellico.

Local legend states the name is derived from Cherokee words 'ta-li' and 'ye-li-quu' meaning 'just two' or 'two is enough'. Supposedly three tribal elders had planned to meet to determine the location of the Cherokee Nation's permanent capital. Two elders arrived and waited for the third. As dusk approached, they decided that 'two is enough', or 'ta-li-ye-li-quu' which later became anglicanized to Tahlequah. According to tribal elders and Cherokee County elders, this legend first began to circulate in the 1930s. Tahlequah was a settlement as early as 1832. After the Western Cherokee agreed in 1834 to let the newer migrants settle near them, they joined their government with the Eastern Cherokee at Tahlequah in 1839. Tahlequah was named long before it was chosen as the Cherokee capital.

Cherokee Nation capital
In 1839, Tahlequah was designated the capital of ancestors of both the Cherokee Nation and the United Keetoowah Band of Cherokee Indians. Initially the government buildings were a complex of log or framed structures. Most of these buildings were destroyed during the Civil War, during which the Cherokee became divided into two bitterly opposing sides. The Cherokee Supreme Court Building, located in downtown Tahlequah and constructed in 1844, is the oldest public building in Oklahoma.

Several markers of Cherokee and Native American heritage are found in town: street signs and business signs are noted in both the Cherokee language and English. Such signs use the  syllabary created by Sequoyah, a Cherokee scholar of the 1820s who created the writing system.

Post Civil War rebuilding and development
After the war, a brick capitol was built and first occupied in 1870. In 1907, at the time of Oklahoma statehood, the building was converted into the Cherokee County courthouse. It was returned to the Cherokee Nation in 1970.

In 1886, the first telephone company in Indian Territory was built. The Cherokee Female Seminary, which had originally been constructed in Park Hill, burned in 1887, and was rebuilt in Tahlequah. After statehood, it was taken over by the state to become Northeastern State Normal School and the Northeastern State Teachers College (now Northeastern State University). The first bank in the Cherokee Nation opened in 1891 on Muskogee Avenue.

A major fire destroyed much of downtown Tahlequah in 1895. The buildings destroyed were mostly wooden and were replaced with brick structures.

In 1902, the Ozark and Cherokee Central Railway built a line into Tahlequah.

Tahlequah continued to grow. During the 1990s, it was the fourth fastest growing city in Oklahoma.

Geography
Tahlequah is located at  (35.9153700, -94.9699560). The city has a total area of 12.45 square miles (32.2 km), all land.

Climate
Tahlequah, like most of the Southern United States, has a humid subtropical climate (Köppen Cfa) with uncomfortably hot and humid summers, generally warm but very variable springs and autumns, and cool winters with frequent frosts and occasional spells of severe weather dominated by cold, dry Canadian air.

Demographics

As of the 2010 census, there were 15,753 people, 6,111 households, and 3,351 families residing in the city. The population density was 1,312.75 per square mile (506.5/km). There were 6,857 housing units at an average density of 571.4 per square mile (220.5/km). The racial makeup of the city was 53.8% White, 2.4% African American, 30.0% Native American, 1.3% Asian, 0.0% Pacific Islander, 3.7% from other races, and 8.7% from two or more races. Hispanic or Latino of any race were 9.8% of the population.

Out of 6,111 households, 25.9% had children under the age of 18 living with them, 35.5% were married couples living together, 14.3% had a female householder with no husband present, and 45.2% were non-families. 34.3% of all households were made up of individuals, and 10.9% had someone living alone who was 65 years of age or older. The average household size was 2.31 and the average family size was 2.99.

In the city, the population was spread out, with 21.1% under the age of 18, 23.6% from 18 to 24, 24.3% from 25 to 44, 18.5% from 45 to 64, and 12.5% who were 65 years of age or older. The median age was 27.8 years. For every 100 females, there were 93.7 males. For every 100 females age 18 and over, there were 91.2 males.

As of 2013, the median household income was $29,114 and the median family income was $43,940. Males had a median income of $32,475 versus $27,939 for females. The per capita income for the city was $17,003. About 20.7% of families and 33.3% of the population were below the poverty line, including 43.2% of those under age 18 and 21.8% of those age 65 or over.

Many people in Tahlequah speak Cherokee, and there is a Cherokee language immersion school in Tahlequah, Oklahoma, that educates students from pre-school through eighth grade with the Cherokee language as the medium of instruction, and no English.

Education

Primary and secondary education
Most of the city is zoned to Tahlequah Public Schools, while portions are zoned to Briggs Public School.

Education within the Tahlequah city limits consists of one early learning center serving students in Pre-K:  Sequoyah; three elementary schools serving students in Kindergarten through 5th grade:  Greenwood, Cherokee, and Heritage; one middle school with grades 6 through 8:  Tahlequah Middle School; and one high school with grades 9-12: Tahlequah High School.  Tahlequah High School serves as the main high school within the county as well and is fed by other rural Pre-K through 8th grade schools within Cherokee County.

The following schools have Tahlequah postal addresses but are in the Park Hill census-designated place.
 Cherokee Immersion School
 Sequoyah Schools

Colleges

Northeastern State University is the oldest institution of higher learning in the state of Oklahoma as well as one of the oldest institutions of higher learning west of the Mississippi River. Tahlequah is home to the capital of the Cherokee Nation of Oklahoma and about 25 percent of the students at NSU identify themselves as American Indian. The university has many courses focused on Native American linguistics, and offers Cherokee language Education as a major. Cherokee can be studied as a second language, and some classes are taught in Cherokee for first language speakers as well.

Culture

Cherokee National Supreme Court Museum
The building that once housed the Supreme Court of the Cherokee Nation has been converted into a museum, the Cherokee National Supreme Court Museum and is open to the public. It reportedly is the oldest public building in Oklahoma.  It was constructed on the southeast corner of the town square by James S. Pierce in 1844. The first chief justice of the Cherokee Nation, John Martin (judge) (1784–1840) held court here. The printing press for the early-day Cherokee Phoenix newspaper was also located in this building, and a reproduction of the press and the newsroom can be seen here.

Cherokee National History Museum
The Cherokee National Capitol building was built on the town square in 1869. It contained the nation's executive and legislative offices until the tribal national government was dissolved in 1906, in preparation for Oklahoma's statehood.  The building is listed on the National Register of Historic Places (NRHP) and is designated as a National Landmark.

Exhibits include not only works by Cherokee artists, but also artifacts loaned by the collections of the Cherokee Nation Archives, Gilcrease Museum, Smithsonian Institution and the Oklahoma Historical Society.

Notable people

 Bill John Baker, former Principal Chief of the Cherokee Nation
 Roy Boney, Jr., animator, artist, graphic novelist, language advocate
 Tyler Bunch, puppeteer 
 Robert J. Conley, author
 Butch Davis, head football coach, University of North Carolina (2007–2011), Former Head Coach, University of Miami (1995–2000)
 Bill Harrelson, Major League Baseball pitcher
 Ryan Helsley, Major League Baseball pitcher
 Murv Jacob, artist and illustrator, owned an art gallery and studio in Tahlequah for three decades, where he died. 
 Stacy Leeds, tribal judge, Indian law professor, Dean of University of Arkansas School of Law
 Ronald G. Lewis, social worker and professor
 Wilma Mankiller, born in Tahlequah, first female Principal Chief of the Cherokee Nation
 Sonny Sixkiller, football player
 Chaske Spencer, Actor, born in Tahlequah, member of the Lakota Sioux Nation. 
 Chad "Corntassel" Smith, author, lawyer, and former Principal Chief of the Cherokee Nation
 Wes Studi, actor, born in Tahlequah
 Johnny Tiger Jr., artist
 Merle Travis, country singer and musician, 1917–1983; died at his home in Tahlequah
 Robert Presley, former Riverside County (CA) Undersheriff, California State Senator (1975-1995)
 Florence Owens Thompson,  subject of Dorothea Lange's famous photograph Migrant Mother
Evan Felker lead singer and song writer of the Tahlequah-based country rock band Turnpike Troubadors
Adrian Houser Professional pitcher for the Milwaukee Brewers
Boniblu Choate, University of Arkansas Pomfret Hall RA
Malcolm Rodriguez Professional football for the Detroit Lions

In media
Tahlequah is featured in the well-known book Where the Red Fern Grows and "Summer of the Monkeys" by Wilson Rawls.
Tahlequah was once named as the fictional "home office" for the Top Ten Lists on Late Night with David Letterman.
Tahlequah is mentioned several times in Mark Twain's 1892 novel The American Claimant as the origin of a bank robber named One-Armed Pete.
Tahlequah is visited by the main characters in "Westward of the Law" by Matt Braun.
Tahlequah is the principal location in Larry McMurtry's "Zeke and Ned".
In The Burning Maze by Rick Riordan, Cherokee demigoddess Piper McLean relocates to Tahlequah.
Starcarbon by Ellen Gilchrist takes place largely in Tahlequah.
 Tahlequah is featured in the Newbery Medal winning civil war novel Rifles for Watie written in 1957 by Harold Keith.

Notes

References

External links

 
 Tahlequah Public Library
 Tahlequah Tourism

 
Cities in Cherokee County, Oklahoma
Cities in Oklahoma
Cherokee towns in Oklahoma
County seats in Oklahoma
Former colonial and territorial capitals in the United States
Micropolitan areas of Oklahoma
Cherokee Nation (1794–1907)
Populated places established in 1839
United Keetoowah Band of Cherokee Indians
1839 establishments in Indian Territory